Geoffrey of Wells (Galfridius Fontibus) was a mid-12th-century English hagiographer and a canon of Wells Cathedral, whose  ("The infancy of Saint Edmund"), part of the burgeoning library of 12th-century legendaries concerning Saint Edmund, accounted the royal saint's childhood to have been full of adventure. He dedicated his "largely spurious account" to Ording, eighth abbot of Bury St. Edmunds, and spoke of the encouragement of another well-placed Anglo-Saxon, Prior Sihtric. The manuscript of Geoffrey's pious embroidery was among the manuscripts collected by the early 17th-century antiquary Robert Bruce Cotton, now conserved in the British Library in London.

References

Notes

Further reading

Victoria B Jordan, Boston College, Monastic hagiography in Anglo-Saxon and Anglo-Norman England: The cases of Edward the Confessor and St. Edmund, King and Martyr dissertation, 1995.

Geoffrey of Wells